'Agȋȇl The Intelligence (beneficial spirit) of Saturn mentioned as a Spirit in such works as the  Key of Solomon. As it says on the 10th Plate: "The First Pentacle of Mercury.--It serveth to invoke the Spirits who are under the Firmament." And the letters forming the names of the Spirits Yekahel and Agiel. He is also described as being the presiding spirit of the planet Saturn, with Zȃzȇl.

See also

 List of angels in theology
 Key of Solomon
 Lesser Key of Solomon
 Magical Treatise of Solomon
 Saturn#Ancient observations
 Testament of Solomon
 Zazel – erotic art film 1997

References

External links
 Plate X of the Key of Solomon
 The Key of Solomon the King

Individual angels